Kız Kolunda Damga Var is a 1967 Turkish comedy film, directed by Halit Refiğ and starring Fatma Girik, Sadri Alisik, and Sevda Nur.

References

External links
Kız Kolunda Damga Var at the Internet Movie Database

1967 films
Turkish comedy films
1967 comedy films
Films directed by Halit Refiğ